Páll Ólafsson may refer to:

 Páll Ólafsson (handballer) (born 1960), Icelandic Olympic handballer
 Páll Ólafsson (poet) (1827–1905), Icelandic poet